Ciliogenesis And Planar Polarity Effector 1 is a protein that in humans is encoded by the CPLANE1 gene.

References

External links

Further reading